Carlton Towers railway station served the village of Carlton, Selby, England from 1885 to 1959 on the Hull and Barnsley Railway.

History 
The station opened as Carlton on 27 July 1885 by the Hull, Barnsley and West Riding Junction Railway. 'Towers' was added on to its name on 1 July 1922. The station closed to passengers on 1 January 1932 and to goods traffic in 1959.

References

External links 

Railway stations in Great Britain opened in 1885
Railway stations in Great Britain closed in 1932
1885 establishments in England
1959 disestablishments in England
Former Hull and Barnsley Railway stations